Economic sanctions are defined as financial penalties imposed on a nation, country or self-governing state by an individual or a group of nations in order to harm and disrupt the economy of the target nation. This effect can be accomplished by imposing tariffs, quotas, subsidies, restrictions on financial transactions and much more.

History of economic sanctions on the United States of America 
The United States of America has imposed economic sanctions on multiple countries, such as France, Great Britain and Japan since the 1800s. Some of the most famous economic sanctions in the history of the United States of America include The Boston Tea Party against the British Parliament, The Smoot-Hawley Tariff Act  against the United States of America's trading partners and the 2002 steel tariff against The People's Republic of China. Most recently, the United States of America has been involved in multiple trade wars and imposed economic sanctions on multiple countries such as The People's Republic of China, Iran and Russia. In retaliation, multiple countries have imposed economic sanctions on the United States of America.

List of current sanctions against the United States of America 

The United States of America had multiple sanctions imposed on them throughout history. Most recently, United States President Donald Trump has introduced economic sanctions in 2018 on multiple trade partners, including The People's Republic of China, Canada, the European Union and Mexico. This series of tariffs are known as the "Trump Tariffs" and has been responded negatively to by sanctioned trade partners. The United States of America has also imposed ongoing economic sanctions on Iran and Russia dating back to 1995 and 2014 respectively. As of June 2019, the following countries and political unions below have introduced economic sanctions against the United States.

Reasons for economic sanction against the United States of America

The People's Republic of China 

The trade war between the People's Republic of China and the United States began in 2018.  Initially conducted through tariffs and other types of economic sanctions, Donald Trump, the former President of the United States of America imposed tariffs on Chinese goods valued at $250 billion, escalating the trade war.

China's Ministry of Commerce responded by imposing retaliatory tariffs on U.S. goods of a similar value, including a tariff of $60 billion U.S goods and a further $100 billion tariff on the United States of America.

Canada 

Donald Trump, the former President of the United States of America introduced a tariff on Canadian steel and aluminium on 31 May 2018.

Justin Trudeau, the Prime Minister of Canada retaliated to the tariff with economic sanctions on U.S goods such as steel and aluminum, as well as goods such as paper, plywood, whiskey and more on 31 May 2018.

European Union 

Former US President Donald Trump introduced a tariff on Canadian steel and aluminium on 31 May 2018 as part of the Trump tariffs.

The European Union retaliated with a tariff on U.S goods such as steel and aluminium, along with other agricultural goods such as corn, orange juice, cranberry juice and manufactured goods such as electronic devices, washing machines, motorcycles, makeup and cosmetics, clothing and more on 22 June 2018.

Mexico 

Former President of the United States of America Donald Trump introduced a tariff on Canadian steel and aluminium on 31 May 2018 as part of the Trump tariffs.

President Andrés Manuel López Obrador 
of Mexico retaliated with a tariff on U.S goods such as steel and aluminium, along with other agricultural goods such as cheese, pork, whiskey, apples and more on 5 June 2018.

Iran 

In November 1979, then President Jimmy Carter announced and imposed the sanctions for the first time after the American Embassy in Tehran was seized by a group of radical students and people were taken hostage. In 1984, The United States of America approved sanctions to prohibit weapons sales and assistance to Iran. Since then, there have been no formal diplomatic relations between Iran and the United States of America.

Russia 

Dating from March 2014, the United States and Russia has had a strained diplomatic relationship due to a series of political events. On 6 August 2014, Russia imposed a ban on U.S agricultural products and since then, the USA and Russia have been imposing economic sanctions on goods such as oil, agricultural products and more.

Effects of economic sanctions

Economic effects 
The economic effects of an economic sanction can affect both the target country and the country that imposed the sanction. One immediate effect for the targeted country will be an increase in price or ban on the targeted exported goods; this can be seen in Mexico, as goods such as steel, pork, cheese and apples will become more expensive. Also, The People's Republic of China has fallen from the second largest to the third largest market capitalization due to the ongoing trade war with the United States of America. As the U.S is one of China's largest trading partners, an economic loss for both countries is created.

Economic sanctions can negatively affect the targeted country's GDP by increasing unemployment rate. By imposing tariffs on certain industries, the income of that industry will decrease due to a fall in production of the goods targeted and an increase in price of the goods in the country that imposed the economic sanction. As the price of the product increases, consumers may choose to purchase domestic goods rather than imported goods due to the difference in price. Also, due to the decrease in production of the targeted goods, the producers of the goods will no longer require as much manpower as before, this will lead to an increase in unemployment rate as workers will be laid off in order to reduce costs for the producers. According to Okun's law, there is a clear relationship between economic growth and unemployment rate. Okun's law states that for every 1% increase in unemployment rate, a country's GDP will decrease by 2%. The effects above will lead to a decrease in economic growth for the targeted country while the country that imposed the economic sanction may experience an increase in economic growth due to consumers choosing to purchase domestic goods rather than imported goods.

Tariffs and other economic sanctions are a main source of income for governments and businesses will profit from economic sanctions due to the decrease in competition from other countries. However, if the targeted country retaliates with economic sanctions against the imposing country, consumers will be worse off due to the increase in price of both domestic and imported goods, while both governments will not generate much revenue due to the two economic sanctions nullifying each other's effects.

Political effects 
An economic sanction could cripple the targeted country's industries. For example, if a targeted country's industry gets sanctioned for a prolonged period of time, it can bring effects such as unemployment and industry collapse to the targeted industry. A real life example would be the U.S's sanction on Venezuela's oil industry. Because of the economic sanction, Venezuela has turned from a democratic to autocratic country. Since the election of Nicolás Maduro as president in 2013, Maduro has been accused by Western interests (including their media apparatuses and NGOs) of using his power as the President of Venezuela to maintain his power. This can put significant political pressure on the targeted country's government from its citizens.

Economic sanctions are often used as political weapons towards other countries, President Donald Trump and the United States of America has been noted for using economic sanctions, such as tariffs against Iran and North Korea in order to restrict these countries from using weapons of mass destruction, In particular, the economic sanctions against Iran are effective in restricting the development for nuclear weapons, while the economic sanctions against North Korea are used to halt North Korea's development in missile and nuclear weapons programs, military technology and equipment, labor and more.

Moral Issues 
As economic sanctions are becoming more widespread in the past century, there are some moral issues to such sanctions that should be recognized. One notable example is that some countries impose tariffs or bans on certain goods to protect their industry. While the country that imposed the tariff may argue the economic sanction is justified since they need to protect their new industries against foreign competition that have well-developed and established industries, this can have unintended effects on the targeted country. For example, since the targeted country's industry will have less income due to the exported goods being more expensive in other countries. Consumers may choose to purchase domestic goods to avoid paying high prices. This will lead to increasing unemployment rates in the targeted country since the industry no longer requires as much manpower due to the decrease in sales and a fall in production. Consequently, the unemployed workforce will not be able to provide for their family since they lost their source of income. In Venezuela, nine out of ten Venezuelans live in poverty and in 2017, Venezuelans lost an average of twenty four pounds. Most Venezuelans live without access to basic goods, such as food and medical supplies due to a shortage of basic goods in Venezuela. The effects mentioned above combined to form a humanitarian crisis in Venezuela, where one out of every ten Venezuelans have fled the country in hopes of a better living condition elsewhere.

While the country imposing the economic sanction gains both economic and political advantages, the targeted country will suffer (if one views 'suffering' as the continued existence of their elected governments) as a result from the particular economic sanction. One real life example is the United States of America's sanction on Venezuela's oil industry. As Venezuela is heavily dependent on their oil industry, which contains around 50% of their GDP, the sanction led to hyperinflation, a decrease in the production of oil and a perceived turn to autocratic power by many thinktanks and NGOs in Venezuela. This has also allowed President Nicolás Maduro to take advantage of the situation to secure his power in Venezuela. Over the course of his presidency, Nicolás Maduro has been found guilty by the Organization of American States for dozens of murders, over 12,000 cases of arbitrary detentions, over 290 cases of torture and more. As a result, more than 1.1 million people have been displaced due to the ongoing humanitarian crisis in Venezuela.

References

Further reading 
Leyton-Brown, D. (1987). The utility of international economic sanctions. 1st ed. London: Routledge.

Cortright, D., Dellums, R. and Lopez, G. (1995). Economic Sanctions. 1st ed. New York: Routledge.

Che, Y., Lu, Y., Pierce, J., Schott, P. and Tao, Z. (2016). Does Trade Liberalization with China Influence U.S. Elections?. 1st ed. [ebook] Massachusetts: National Bureau of Economic Research. Available at: https://www.nber.org/papers/w22178 [Accessed 31 Mar. 2019].

Broadberry, S. and Harrison, M. (2009). The Economics of World War I. New York: Cambridge University      Press.

International sanctions
Foreign relations of the United States
History of foreign trade of the United States
History of international trade